The God Engines is a 2009 science fiction/fantasy novella by John Scalzi.

Synopsis 

The story takes place in a universe where space travel is accomplished by chaining intelligent, human-like creatures called gods to a spacecraft and torturing them to drive the ship. The people are ruled by an organization called the Bishopry Militant, who worship a powerful being. Captain Ean Tephe is completely faithful to the Bishopry, but his faith comes under test when he is assigned a secret mission in which his ship's god seems to have a keen interest.

Reception
The God Engines was a finalist for the 2009 Nebula Award for Best Novella and the 2010 Hugo Award for Best Novella. Publishers Weekly called it "ferociously inventive, painfully vivid, dispassionately bleak and dreadfully memorable", and compared it to a collaboration between J. G. Ballard and H.P. Lovecraft.

References

External links
 First chapter of The God Engines, at Scalzi.com

2009 American novels
2009 science fiction novels
Religion in science fiction
American speculative fiction novellas
Works by John Scalzi
Subterranean Press books